Amnéville is a commune in the Moselle department in Grand Est in northeastern France. The town is an important tourist and thermal spa center in France.

Geography
Amnéville is located in the Moselle valley, between Metz and Thionville.

Population

History 
A Celtic presence on the municipal territory of Amnéville has been attested since the 6th century BC. Excavations have demonstrated the existence of a village and a necropolis.

Amnéville was part of the Duchy of Bar until 1480, then of the Duchy of Lorraine.

During the first German annexation, in 1894, the municipality of Amnéville was created by splitting the municipality of Gandrange. The Rombas factory was created at this time. The new municipality was named Stahlheim, literally "City of Steel". Stahlheim-Amnéville, will later be renamed Amnéville-Stahlheim. It became French again in 1919.

Sights
Traces of Roman road
Remains of a Roman bridge
14th-century castle and church
Zoo d'Amnéville

Other sights include the casino that will host a stage of the 2010/2011 World Poker Tour season and an indoor ski slope. Amnéville also has a tourist and thermal center.

Personalities
 Patrick Battiston, footballer 
 Raymond Baratto, footballer

Sport
 The Amneville Golf Club

See also
 Communes of the Moselle department

References

External links

 Website of the town in English

Communes of Moselle (department)
Duchy of Bar